"Melody of Eyes (Hitomi no Melody)" is the third Japanese single by the South Korean boy band Boyfriend. It was released on March 27 in 4 different editions. "Hitomi no Melody" was the 44th ending theme song of long time Japanese anime series Detective Conan and TO MOON was used as the ending theme song of Boyfriend's TV show in Japan entitled, Tokyo Etoile Academy of Music last January and February 2013.

Background
The album was announced by the group's Japanese official website, with details of the album release and along with a release of the group's first DVD 1st Live DVD [Love Communication 2012~XMass Bell~]. The single was released in four different editions: a Normal Edition [CD] consists of 2 song with 2 instrumentals and extra trading card in 1 of 7; a Limited Edition [CD +DVD] with "Hitomi no Melody" music video and making of and a trading card (1 of 7); Lawson HMV Limited Edition [CD + DVD] with 40 page full color photobook and trading card (1 of 7); Lawson  HMV Limited Edition [CD + DVD](Detective Conan version) with Hitomi no Melody (TV SIZE) and Detective Conan card (1 of 2).

Singles
Hitomi no Melody/Melody of Eyes, the song was picked up as the 44th ending theme song for popular Japanese anime series Detective Conan.

Promotion
Melody of Eyes makes to top five for six days and their highest ranked is second place on Oricon, and they ranked number one on weekly chart of Billboard Hot Animation.

Track listing

Music videos

Charts

Oricon

Other charts

Release history

References

2013 singles
2013 songs
Japanese-language songs
Starship Entertainment singles
Case Closed songs